The Old Searcy County Jail is a historic building on Center Street (Arkansas Highway 27), on the south side of the courthouse square in Marshall, Arkansas.  It is a two-story stone structure, built out of local sandstone, with a pyramidal roof topped by a cupola.  The front facade, three bays wide, has a central bay that projects slightly, rising to a gabled top, with barred windows at each level.  The main entrance is recessed in the rightmost bay.  The building's interior houses jailer's quarters on the ground floor and cells on the upper level.  Built in 1902, it was used as a jail until 1976, and briefly as a museum thereafter.

The building was listed on the National Register of Historic Places in 2010.

See also
National Register of Historic Places listings in Searcy County, Arkansas

References

Jails on the National Register of Historic Places in Arkansas
Romanesque Revival architecture in Arkansas
Government buildings completed in 1902
Buildings and structures in Searcy County, Arkansas
National Register of Historic Places in Searcy County, Arkansas